Conophis is a genus of snakes in the subfamily Dipsadinae of the family Colubridae. The genus is endemic to Mexico and Central America.

Species and geographic ranges
The genus Conophis contains the following three species which are recognized as being valid.
 Conophis lineatus  – Belize, Costa Rica, Guatemala, Honduras, Mexico, Nicaragua – road guarder
 Conophis morai  – Mexico – Mora's road guarder
 Conophis vittatus  – Guatemala, Mexico – striped road guarder

Nota bene: Binomial authorities in parentheses indicates that the species was originally described in a genus other than Conophis.

References

Further reading
 Heimes, Peter (2016). Snakes of Mexico: Herpetofauna Mexicana Vol. I. Frankfurt, Germany: Chimaira. 572 pp. .
 Peters W (1860). "Drei neue Schlangen des k. zoologischen Museums aus America vor und fügte hieran Bemerkungen über die generelle Unterscheidung von anderen bereits bekannten Arten ". Monatsberichte der Königlichen Preussischen Akademie der Wissenschaften zu Berlin 1860: 517-521 + one plate. (Conophis, new genus, p. 519; C. vittatus, new species, pp. 519-520 + plate figures 3, 3a, 3b, 3c, 3d). (in German).

Conophis
Snake genera
Taxa named by Wilhelm Peters